Bindi is both a surname and a given name. Notable people with the name include:

Surname
Clara Bindi (born 1927), Italian actress
Daisy Bindi (1904–1962), Australian Aboriginal activist 
Emanuele Bindi (born 1981), Italian cyclist
Giacomo Bindi (born 1987), Italian footballer 
Rosy Bindi (born 1951), Italian politician
Umberto Bindi (1932–2002), Italian singer-songwriter

Given name
Bindi Irwin (born 1998), Australian actress, television presenter, and daughter of wildlife conservationist Steve Irwin
Bindi Kullar (born 1976), Canadian field hockey player
 The Groovy Girls doll line, by Manhattan Toy, features a doll named Bindi.

See also
 Bindy

Italian-language surnames
Australian given names